Carpolestes simpsoni is an extinct species of Plesiadapiformes, which is one of the earliest primate-like mammals appearing in the fossil record during the late Paleocene.  C. simpsoni had grasping digits but no forward-facing eyes.

Weighing about 100 grams, C. simpsoni appeared adapted for an arboreal habitat.  One large, nail-tipped toe opposed other toes, allowing a firm grip on branches. Like other species of Carpolestes, the dental morphology of C. simpsoni is specially adapted to eating fruit, seeds, and invertebrates.

References

External links 
Mikko's Phylogeny Archive
  National Geographic source

Plesiadapiformes
Paleocene mammals
Prehistoric mammals of North America